Anderson Costa (born 13 March 1984) is a Brazilian footballer.

Biography
Anderson was born in Rio de Janeiro.  He made 55 appearances and scored 14 goals in the Campeonato Brasileiro Série A for Vasco da Gama from 2002 to 2005. He renewed his contract in March 2004, signed a 5-year contract. In January 2005 he also spent 6 months with Spanish Segunda División club Córdoba as one of the non-EU players. He was transferred to Dinamo Zagreb in January 2006. However, he requested to leave in July. He was loaned to Portuguese Liga de Honra side in January 2007. The team finished as the runner-up and promoted, however he only played 3 times. He then left for Greek side Aris Thessaloniki and in December 2007 left for Brazilian side Bahia. He was released in April. At the start of 2008–09 season he left for Lucena of Spanish Segunda División B. In January 2009 he was signed by Duque de Caxias in 1-year contract.

In July 2009 he was transferred to Pro Vercelli after a short period with Bnei Sakhnin, which at that time he obtained a Portuguese passport, made him able to by-pass the non-EU immigration ban of Italian lower divisions, along with countryman Adriano da Matta Inácio. His contract was terminated in January 2010. In February, he was signed by Guarani in 1-year deal, and in June left for Santo André, also in 1-year deal. However, after 7 appearances in 2010 Campeonato Brasileiro Série B, he was released in October.

International career
Anderson Costa played in 2001 FIFA U-17 World Championship.

References

External links
 
 Football.it 
 
 
 Portuguese career at LPFP.pt 

Croatian Football League players
CR Vasco da Gama players
Córdoba CF players
GNK Dinamo Zagreb players
Vitória S.C. players
Aris Thessaloniki F.C. players
Esporte Clube Bahia players
Lucena CF players
Duque de Caxias Futebol Clube players
F.C. Pro Vercelli 1892 players
Guarani FC players
Esporte Clube Santo André players
Criciúma Esporte Clube players
ABC Futebol Clube players
Macaé Esporte Futebol Clube players
Association football forwards
Brazilian expatriate footballers
Expatriate footballers in Spain
Expatriate footballers in Croatia
Expatriate footballers in Portugal
Expatriate footballers in Greece
Expatriate footballers in Italy
Brazilian expatriate sportspeople in Spain
Brazilian expatriate sportspeople in Croatia
Brazilian expatriate sportspeople in Portugal
Brazilian expatriate sportspeople in Greece
Brazilian expatriate sportspeople in Italy
Footballers from Rio de Janeiro (city)
Brazilian footballers
1984 births
Living people